Ji Daoshuai  (born ) is a Chinese male volleyball player. He was part of the China men's national volleyball team at the 2014 FIVB Volleyball Men's World Championship in Poland. He plays for Suntory Sunbirds now.

Clubs
 Shandong (2009 - 2019)
 Suntory Sunbirds (2019–present)

References

1992 births
Living people
Chinese men's volleyball players
Place of birth missing (living people)
Volleyball players at the 2014 Asian Games
Asian Games competitors for China
21st-century Chinese people